Edwin Paul Swatek (January 7, 1885 – January 2, 1966) was an American backstroke swimmer and water polo player who competed in the 1904 Summer Olympics.

Career
In the 1904 Olympics he won a silver medal as a member of the Chicago Athletic Association water polo team. He also competed in 100 yard backstroke event, but without winning a medal. It is also possible that he participated in the 50 yard freestyle competition and in the 100 yard freestyle event.

References

External links
profile

1885 births
1966 deaths
Swimmers from Chicago
American male backstroke swimmers
American male water polo players
Olympic swimmers of the United States
Swimmers at the 1904 Summer Olympics
Water polo players at the 1904 Summer Olympics
Olympic silver medalists for the United States in water polo
Medalists at the 1904 Summer Olympics
Water polo players from Chicago
19th-century American people
20th-century American people

ru:Водное поло на летних Олимпийских играх 1904#Составы команд